Edward Dockrill (1838 – 19 November 1927) was a New Zealand politician who served as the 8th Mayor of New Plymouth. He was known as a powerful advocate of public works, supported the protection of "indigenous land rights" and was a critic of pastoralism. He was also known to be an abolitionist.

Dockrill was born in the Bay of Islands district of New Plymouth, and was the first mayor of the port.

By the mid-1800s he had worked as a state-appointed surveyor, and by 1899 had formed a natural resource consulting firm, Jemmingit. He also began a company selling timber. In 1903 he was appointed New Plymouth's 16th Mayor.

Biography

Early life
Dockrill was born in County Wexford, Ireland in 1838. He left Ireland and moved to New Zealand in 1866 aboard the ship Ballarat, landing in Auckland. He then spent fourteen years gold mining on the West Coast and later in Thames. In 1880 he moved to New Plymouth and set up business there as a shoemaker. He later married Elizabeth Bosworth on 26 December 1882.

Political career
In August 1885, Dockrill was elected to the New Plymouth council and served until he was elected as Mayor of New Plymouth in December 1897. He served until May 1903 and was re-elected for a second spell as Mayor between 1906 and 1908. He also served on the Hospital and Charitable Aid Board, the local school committee, and a member of the Board of Governors of New Plymouth High School.

Dockrill stood for Parliament in the 1887 election for the Taranaki electorate, coming third. He later stood in the 1907 Taranaki by-election as the officially endorsed candidate of the Liberal Party, coming a close second.

Death
Dockrill died in New Plymouth on 19 November 1927.

References

1838 births
1927 deaths
New Zealand people of Irish descent
People from New Plymouth
Mayors of New Plymouth
New Zealand Liberal Party politicians
Unsuccessful candidates in the 1887 New Zealand general election
19th-century New Zealand politicians